Paratenthras martinsi is a species of beetle in the family Cerambycidae, the only species in the genus Paratenthras.

References

Acanthocinini